Yosef Chaim Sonnenfeld, also spelled Zonnenfeld (1 December 1848 – 26 February 1932), was the rabbi and co-founder of the Edah HaChareidis, a Haredi Jewish community in Jerusalem, during the years of the British Mandate of Palestine. Sonnenfeld was born in Verbó in the Austrian Empire. His father, Rabbi Avraham Shlomo Zonnenfeld, died when Chaim was five years old.

Sonnenfeld was a student of Samuel Benjamin Sofer (the Ksav Sofer).

Sonnenfeld was the right-hand man of Yehoshua Leib Diskin and assisting the latter in communal activities, such as the founding of schools and the Diskin Orphanage, and fighting against secularism.

Sonnenfeld and Abraham Isaac Kook were vigorous opponents in many areas.

Works 
Sonnenfeld wrote scholarly commentaries on the Torah, Talmud, and Shulchan Aruch. His responsa are collected in the work Salmas Chaim.

References 

 Sonnenfeld, Shlomo Zalman. 1983. Guardian of Jerusalem: The Life and Times of Yosef Chaim Sonnenfeld (Artscroll History Series). Adapted from Ha-Ish Al Ha-Homah (3 vols.), by Hillel Danzinger. Brooklyn, New York: Mesorah Publications. 
 Sonnenfeld, Shlomo Zalman, ed. 2002. Rabbi Yosef Chaim Sonnenfeld on the Parashah. Brooklyn, New York: Mesorah Publications, 2002.

Gallery 

Yoseph Chaïm Sonnenfeld during the years of the British mandate.
British High Commissioner's reception at Government House, Jerusalem, with texts of the Proclamation, 1920. L-R: Rabbis Moshe Leib Bernstein, Yosef Chaïm Sonnenfeld, Yerucham Diskin, and Baruch Reuven Jungreis.
Yoseph Chaïm Sonnenfeld receives Tomáš Garrigue Masaryk, President of Czechoslovakia, during the latter's visit to Jerusalem, 1927.
Yosef Chaïm Sonnenfeld (left) with Rabbi Abraham Isaac Kook, 1930s.

References

External links 

 (Excerpt from Artscroll biography of Rabbi Sonnenfeld)

1848 births
1932 deaths
People from Vrbové
Slovak Orthodox rabbis
Austro-Hungarian rabbis
Austro-Hungarian emigrants to the Ottoman Empire
Orthodox rabbis in Mandatory Palestine
Rabbis of the Edah HaChareidis
Chief rabbis of cities
Anti-Zionist Haredi rabbis
19th-century rabbis in Jerusalem
20th-century rabbis in Jerusalem
Mohels
Burials at the Jewish cemetery on the Mount of Olives